Puerto Galera, officially the Municipality of Puerto Galera, is a 1st class municipality in the province of Oriental Mindoro, Philippines. According to the 2020 census, it has a population of 41,961 people.

It is mainly accessible from the Southern Luzon gateway port of Batangas by bamboo boats (bangka) operated by local regular operators. Seaplane Operator Air Juan Aviation, Inc. flies two daily flights from Manila to Puerto Galera on their Cessna Grand Caravan Seaplanes.

History 
Chinese traders possibly knew the place before the arrival of the Spaniards but there is no evidence of Chinese settlement. The place was likely also known by other Southeast Asian merchants, who would have found it convenient to load and unload trading goods. The state of Ma-i extended to the Puerto Galera area. The bay was a convenient place to shelter ships against bad weather, and a warehouse was built to store supplies and trade black rice from Muelle.

In April 1570, the Spaniards arrived in Bombon (now known as Batangas), and later sailed through the Isla Verde Passage, landed and called the place Puerto Galera (the port of Galleons). Miguel López de Legazpi became the first Spanish governor-general of the island. A garrison for soldiers was built in Muelle, and watch towers were erected in Dampalitan Point to monitor naval activity in the bay. Spaniards came to conquer for their king and chased the Muslim Moro pirates who were disrupting their trade with the Chinese and natives. The latter proved to be not only skilled warriors but also good negotiators even in the face of defeat.

In 1663, a change in the form of administration occurred in the island, the corregidor was replaced by the alcalde-mayor or provincial governor, and the capital was moved from Puerto Galera to Baco. In the seventeenth century, the relative prosperity of the city underwent a serious setback with the rise of Muslim piracy. Both pirates attacks and the mismanagement of the Spaniards resulted in driving the native population either into exile in safer places or sending them inland to comparative safety.

Geography

Barangays
Puerto Galera is politically subdivided into 13 barangays:

Climate

Demographics

The Philippine Statistics Authority characterizes the municipality of Puerto Galera as first class based on household income. The municipality had a population of 32,521 in the 2010 national census. The population in 2012 was estimated to be 35,188.

Economy

The traditional economy of the city used to be fishing and subsistence agriculture, but with the boom of tourism at the end of the 1970s, the service sector became more and more important and led to population and economic growth. Of the 13 villages ("barangays") in Puerto Galera, half now rely on tourism-based activities for sustenance.

In addition, Mindoro is quickly becoming one of the key places in the development of renewable energy in the Philippines. With several large wind, hydroelectric, and geothermal projects under construction, the island hoped in 2012 to be a net exporter of electricity by 2016.

Tourism

Tourism now represents the core activity of the economy of Puerto Galera, which is well known for its beaches, scuba diving and entertainment activities, including "go-go bars". The city and its beaches have also become one of the many sites of the Philippines sex tourism industry.

This coastal town has a number of pocket beaches and snorkeling and scuba diving spots. The area was designated a Man and Biosphere reserve of UNESCO in 1973 and has some of the most diverse coral reef diving in Asia. Since 2001, the marine environment has benefited from a huge reduction in the number of fishermen in the area, as they gain higher revenue from tourism activities.

Puerto Galera is included in the list of the "Club of the Most Beautiful Bays of the World", and is the only bay in the Philippines to be found on this list.

Among the beaches in Puerto Galera are Sabang Beach and White Beach, which have an active nightlife with numerous bars and restaurants. Both places are directly accessible from Batangas by bangka regular lines. On the west, where is only a local boat connection to Abra de Ilog, the planned road between the two cities has not been completed yet. On the east, the city connects by road to Calapan through the Mindoro circular road.

Tourism

Diving and snorkeling 

Puerto Galera, especially the Sabang area, is among the top diving destinations in the Philippines and in Asia. Diving sites are found less than five minutes from Sabang Beach. Diving activities generally focus around the areas either side of Escarceo Point. Marine life is diverse. There are over 180+ species of nudibranchs found in the area, and many species of fish can be seen. A variety of wrecks over the years can be found in addition to the one wreck of an engine of a WWII Japanese patrol boat. The major diving federations PADI, CMAS, NAUI and Technical Diving International (TDI) are represented in the area, offering courses from beginners' open water to advanced and technical diving (rebreather, trimix). Diving trips in the Verde Island Passage, at the heart of the Coral Triangle are organized from Puerto Galera. Many threatened species such as a variety of sea turtles including hawksbills, olive ridleys, and green turtles, humphead wrasses, giant groupers and giant clams are present in the Verde Island Passage.

Environment 
The accelerated development of tourism jeopardizes the preservation of its delicate ecological system consumed by "overdevelopment due to a thriving but runaway free-market tourism". Currently, this appears to be the "biggest problem" of Puerto Galera. Accelerated tourist oriented development poses degradation to the environment, among which, seawater pollution brought about by improper sewage and wastewater discharges. Unless serious action is taken, with regular seawater monitoring, this situation poses a serious threat to the sustainability of various tourist activities at the beaches.

In the summer of 1998, extensive coral bleaching occurred around Medio Island, and a large section of a shallow coral reef system (referred to as the "Coral Gardens") died. Since then, the coral has regrown with a larger diversity of coral species replacing the prolific table corals. Corals in Puerto Galera were largely unaffected by the 2010 El Niño event. The local government declared the 4,828 ha of municipal waters (12,690 ha) as protected waters, giving special protection to the corals and reef fishes.

In 2006, two super typhoons damaged the shallow reefs around Escarceo Point. This represented about 5% of the coral reef in the area. Extensive signs of new coral recruitment were noted in mid-2008. Acropora species (staghorn and table coral) rapidly recolonized the area so that most of the damaged coral has been replaced with new growth.

Gallery

References

External links

 [ Philippine Standard Geographic Code]
Local Governance Performance Management System

Municipalities of Oriental Mindoro
Port cities and towns in the Philippines
Former provincial capitals of the Philippines
Biosphere reserves of the Philippines
Beaches of the Philippines
Underwater diving sites in the Philippines